Patissa curvilinealis is a moth in the family Crambidae. It was described by George Hampson in 1896. It is found in Sri Lanka.

Description
The wingspan is about 12 mm for males and 18 mm for females. The forewings are yellowish white, but the basal two-thirds of the costa are reddish brown. There is a brown line from the costa to the base of the inner margin. The hindwings are white, with faint traces of a medial brown line and a fine marginal line.

References

Moths described in 1896
Schoenobiinae